The Kwisi are a seashore-fishing and hunter-gatherer people of southwest Angola that physically seem to be a remnant of an indigenous population—along with the Kwadi, the Cimba, and the Damara—that are unlike either the San (Bushmen) or the Bantu. Culturally they have been strongly influenced by the Kuvale, and speak the Kuvale dialect of Herero. There may, however, have been a few elderly speakers of an unattested Kwisi language ( Kwisi, Mbundyu, Kwandu) in the 1960s.

References

Ethnic groups in Namibia
Stone Age Africa
Hunter-gatherers of Africa